The 2022 Central American Games, the XII edition of the Central American Games, were to be hosted in Santa Tecla, El Salvador.
This would have been the second time that the games were hosted outside the capital of the country.

The host city was announced on 1 December 2017. However, they were cancelled in 2021 due to the COVID-19 pandemic in El Salvador and the hosting rights were later given to Guatemala and Costa Rica. In 2022, the games were cancelled again after the IOC threatened to suspend the Guatemalan Olympic Committee.

Venues

Santa Tecla

References

Central American Games
International sports competitions hosted by El Salvador
Central American Games
Central American Games
Central American Games
Central American Games 2022
Central American Games